Edward Leeds (baptised 1693 – 1758) was an English barrister, who reached the degree of serjeant-at-law in 1743.

Life
He was only son of Edward Leeds (1664–1729), citizen and mercer of London, and a prominent patron of dissent in Hackney, and his wife Elizabeth Woolley. On 2 May 1710 he was admitted to the Inner Temple, where he was an organiser of a club for dissenting students; and was called to the bar on 29 June 1718. He became eminent as a case lawyer, and enjoyed a large chamber practice.

In February 1742 Leeds was summoned to "take the coif", so becoming a serjeant-at-law, and in Trinity term 1748 was made a king's serjeant. During vacations he lived mainly on his estate at Croxton, Cambridgeshire. He retired from practice in 1755, and died on 5 December 1758. William Cole  described Leeds as "a heavy, dull, plodding man, but a great lover of antiquity." Dudley Ryder commented that he had "no clear method", but saw some positives also.

Family
In 1715 Leeds married Anne (died 1757), third daughter of Joseph Collett of Hertford Castle, formerly governor of Fort St George. They had two sons, Edward and Joseph, and two daughters: Henrietta (1716–1766), who on 26 April 1768 became the second wife of John Howard the philanthropist, and Anne, married on 31 May 1764 to John Barnardiston, a solicitor.

Notes

External links

Attribution

Year of birth missing
1758 deaths
English barristers
Serjeants-at-law (England)
English Dissenters